District 3 is the 3rd district in the Texas House of Representatives that represents part of Montgomery County. This district was first used in the 3rd legislature (1849-1851) and is still in use. Cecil Bell Jr. is its current representative and he has served here since 2013.

Major cities include a portion of Conroe and all of Magnolia and Stagecoach.

List of representatives

References

003